The Ellen Smith House, at 395 N. 300 West in Beaver, Utah, was built in 1894.  It was listed on the National Register of Historic Places in 1983.

It is a one-and-a-half-story house with mansard roof and perhaps some other styling "inspired" by the Second Empire style.

See also
Compare Edward Bird House, also Second Empire, in Beaver

References

National Register of Historic Places in Beaver County, Utah
Second Empire architecture in Utah
Houses completed in 1894